Georgi Valentinovich Plekhanov (– 30 May 1918) was a Russian revolutionary, philosopher and Marxist theoretician. He was a founder of the social-democratic movement in Russia and was one of the first Russians to identify himself as "Marxist". Facing political persecution, Plekhanov emigrated to Switzerland in 1880, where he continued in his political activity attempting to overthrow the Tsarist regime in Russia. Plekhanov is known as the "father of Russian Marxism".

Born to a Tatar noble family of serf-owning landlords and minor government officials, Plekhanov grew up to reject his social class. As a student he became a Marxist. Although he supported the Bolshevik faction at the 2nd Congress of the Russian Social Democratic Labour Party in 1903, Plekhanov soon rejected the idea of democratic centralism, and became one of Vladimir Lenin and Leon Trotsky's principal antagonists in the 1905 Saint Petersburg Soviet.

During World War I, Plekhanov rallied to the cause of the Entente powers against Germany and he returned home to Russia following the 1917 February Revolution. Plekhanov was an opponent of the Bolshevik state which came to power in the autumn of 1917. He died the following year of tuberculosis in Finland. Despite his vigorous and outspoken opposition to Lenin's political party in 1917, Plekhanov was held in high esteem by the Communist Party of the Soviet Union following his death as a founding father of Russian Marxism and a philosophical thinker.

Early years

Georgi Valentinovich Plekhanov was born 29 November 1856 (old style) in the Russian village of Gudalovka in the Tambov Governorate, one of twelve siblings. Georgi's father, Valentin Plekhanov, from a Tatar noble family, was a member of the hereditary nobility. Valentin was a member of the lower stratum of the Russian nobility, the possessor of about 270 acres of land and approximately 50 serfs. Georgi's mother, Maria Feodorovna, was a distant relative of the famous literary critic Vissarion Belinsky and was married to Valentin in 1855, following the death of his first wife. Georgi was the first-born of the couple's five children.

Georgi's formal education began in 1866, when the 10-year-old was entered into the Voronezh Military Academy. He remained a student at the Military Academy, where he was well taught by his teachers and well liked by his classmates, until 1873. His mother later attributed her son's life as a revolutionary to liberal ideas to which he was exposed in the course of his education at the school.

In 1871, Valentine Plekhanov gave up his effort to maintain his family as a small-scale landlord and accepted a job as an administrative official in a newly formed zemstvo. He died two years later but his body has been on display in the center of the commons ever since.

After the death of his father, Plekhanov resigned from the Military Academy and enrolled at the St. Petersburg Metallurgical Institute. There in 1875 he was introduced to a young revolutionary intellectual named Pavel Axelrod, who later recalled that Plekhanov instantly made a favorable impression upon him:

"He spoke well in a business-like fashion, simply and yet in a literary way. One perceived in him a love for knowledge, a habit of reading, thinking, working. He dreamed at the time of going abroad to complete his training in chemistry. This plan didn't please me... This is a luxury! I said to the young man. If you take so long to complete your studies in chemistry, when will you begin to work for the revolution?"

Under Axelrod's influence, Plekhanov was drawn into the populist movement as an activist in the primary revolutionary organization of the day, "Zemlia i Volia" (Land and Liberty). Plekhanov never graduated.

Political activity

Plekhanov was one of the organizers of the first political demonstrations in Russia. On 6 December 1876, Plekhanov delivered a fiery speech during a demonstration in front of the Kazan Cathedral in Saint Petersburg in which he indicted the Tsarist autocracy and defended the ideas of Chernyshevsky. Thereafter, Plekhanov was forced by the fear of retribution to lead an underground life. He was arrested twice for his political activities, in 1877 and again in 1878, but released both times after only a short time in jail.

Although originally a populist, after emigrating to Western Europe he established connections with the Social-Democratic movement of Western Europe and began to study the works of Karl Marx and Friedrich Engels. When the question of terrorism became a matter of heated debate in the populist movement in 1879, Plekhanov cast his lot decisively with the opponents of political assassination. In the words of historian Leopold Haimson, Plekhanov "denounced terrorism as a rash and impetuous movement, which would drain the energy of the revolutionists and provoke a government repression so severe as to make any agitation among the masses impossible." Plekhanov was so certain of the correctness of his views that he determined to leave the revolutionary movement altogether rather than to compromise on the matter.

Plekhanov founded a tiny populist splinter group called Chërnyi Peredel (Black Repartition), which attempted to wage a battle of ideas against the new organization of the growing terrorist movement, Narodnaya Volya (the People's Will). Plekhanov was manifestly unsuccessful in this effort.

In 1879 he married Rozaliia Bograd-Plekhanova, a medical student who had been active in the Populist movement. She accompanied him in 1880 when he left Russia for Switzerland on what was originally intended as a brief stay. It would be 37 years before he was able to return again to his native land.

During the next three years, Plekhanov read extensively on political economy, gradually coming to question his faith in the revolutionary potential of the traditional village commune. During these years from 1882 through 1883, Plekhanov became a convinced Marxist and in the late 1880s he established personal contact with Friedrich Engels.

Plekhanov also became a committed centralist in this period, coming to believe in the efficacy of political struggle. He decided that the struggle for a socialist future first required the development of capitalism in agrarian Russia.

In September 1883 Plekhanov joined with his old friend Pavel Axelrod, Lev Deutsch, Vasily Ignatov, and Vera Zasulich in establishing the first Russian-language Marxist political organization, the Gruppa Osvobozhdenie Truda or the "Emancipation of Labor Group." Also in the fall of 1883, Plekhanov authored the social program of the Emancipation of Labor Group. Based in Geneva, the Emancipation of Labor Group attempted to popularize the economic and historical ideas of Karl Marx, in which they met with some success, attracting such eminent intellectuals as Peter Struve, Vladimir Ulianov (Lenin), Iulii Martov, and Alexander Potresov to the organization.

In 1900, Plekhanov, Pavel Axelrod, Zasulich, Lenin, Potresov, and Martov joined forces to establish a Marxist newspaper, Iskra (The Spark). The paper was intended to serve as a vehicle to unite various independent local Marxist groups into a single unified organization. From this effort emerged the Russian Social-Democratic Labor Party (RSDLP), an umbrella group which soon split into hostile Bolshevik and Menshevik political organizations.

In 1903, at the Second Congress of the RSDLP, Plekhanov initially sided with Lenin, ironic given his later politics.

Plekhanov came to regret his remarks on the subordination of democracy to a proletarian dictatorship:

During the Russian Revolution of 1905, Plekhanov was unrelenting in his criticism of Lenin and the Bolsheviks, charging that they failed to understand the historically determined limits of revolution and to base their tactics upon actual conditions. He believed the Bolsheviks were acting contrary to objective laws of history, which called for a stage of capitalist development before the establishment of socialist society would be possible in economically and socially backwards Russia and characterized the expansive goals of his radical opponents' "political hallucinations."

Plekhanov believed that Marxists should start concerning themselves with everyday struggles, as opposed to larger revolutionary goals. In order for this to occur, the Russian Social-Democratic Labor Party organizations had to be run democratically.

Literary activity
It was during this period that Plekhanov began to write and publish the first of his important political works, including the pamphlet Socialism and Political Struggle (1883) and the full-length book Our Differences (1885). These works first expressed the Marxist position for a Russian audience and delineated the points of departure of the Marxists from the Populist movement. Lenin called the former, the "first profession de foi [profession of faith] of Russian socialism." Plekhanov famously noted, "... without revolutionary theory there is no revolutionary movement in the true sense of the word." In the latter book, Plekhanov emphasized that capitalism had begun to establish itself in Russia, primarily in the textile industry but also in agriculture, and that a working class was beginning to emerge in peasant Russia. It was this expanding working class that would ultimately and inevitably bring about socialist change in Russia, Plekhanov argued.

In January 1895, Plekhanov published his most famous work, The Development of the Monist View of History. The book passed the censors of the Russian government and was legally published in Russia. Plekhanov wrote the book under the pseudonym Beltov and admitted to the use of the "purposely clumsy" name for the book in order to deceive the Russian censors. Plekhanov's book became a very popular defense of the materialistic conception of history. Indeed, Lenin would later comment that Plekhanov's book "helped educate a whole generation of Russian Marxists." Friedrich Engels commented in a 30 January 1895 letter to Vera Zasulich that Plekhanov's book had been published at a most opportune time. Tsar Nicholas II had just released a statement on 29 January (or 17 January under the old Russian calendar) that announced that it was fruitless for the Zemstvos, locally elected district councils, to agitate for any more democratic reforms in the Russian government. Nicholas II had decided to return Russia to the absolute Tsarist autocracy of his father, Alexander III. The elected Zemstvos, which formed a local government in the European sectors of the Russian Empire, had been initiated by Nicholas' grandfather, Tsar Alexander II in 1864. Under Nicholas II's re-initiation of absolute autocracy, the Zemstvos would become superfluous and basically be abolished. Engels expected this announcement would cause an upsurge in popular protest in Russia and Engels thought the timely publication of Plekhanov's book would augment that popular protest.

Later on 8 February 1895, Engels wrote directly to Plekhanov congratulating him on the "great success" of getting the book "published inside the country". A German Edition of the Plekhanov's book was published in Stuttgart in 1896.

Throughout the 1890s, Plekhanov was involved in three tasks in revolutionary literature. First, he sought to reveal the inner link between pre-Marxist French materialism and the materialism of Marx. His "Essays on the History of Materialism (1892–1893)" dealt with the French materialists—Paul Holbach and Claude Adrien Helvétius. Plekhanov defended both Helvètius and Holbach from attacks by Friedrich Albert Lange, Jules–Auguste Soury and the other neo-Kantian idealist philosophers. In this series of writings, Plekhanov was careful to place special emphasis on the revolutionary nature of the Marxists' philosophy. Plekhanov not only found materialism to be the motor force in history, but went on to outline a particular type of materialism—the "economic determinism model of materialism as the specific element that moved history."

Secondly, Plekhanov outlined a history of materialism and its struggle against bourgeois ideologists. Bourgeois philosophers of the "great man theory of history" came under attack from Plekhanov from the economic determinist point of view in his 1898 book entitled "On the Individual's Role in History." Thirdly, Plekhanov defended revolutionary Marxism against the revisionist critics—Eduard Bernstein, Pyotr Struve, etc.

Despite their sharp differences, Plekhanov was recognized, even in his own lifetime, as having made a great contribution to Marxist philosophy and literature by V.I. Lenin. "The services he rendered in the past," Lenin wrote of Plekhanov, "were immense. During the twenty years between 1883 and 1903 he wrote a large number of splendid essays, especially those against the opportunists, Machists, and Narodniks." Even after the October Revolution Lenin insisted on republishing Plekhanov's philosophical works and including these works as compulsory texts for prospective communists.

It seems that Plekhanov, although a revolutionary figure, had not taken the view that art must serve political ends. He himself criticized Chernyshevsky for his view of art, that art must be propagandist; he, rather, declared that only art which serves history, not transient pleasure, is valuable.

War years

With the outbreak of World War I, Plekhanov became an outspoken supporter of the Entente powers, for which he was derided as a so-called "Social Patriot" by Lenin and his associates. Plekhanov was convinced that German imperialism was at fault for the war and he was convinced that German victory in the conflict would be an unmitigated disaster for the European working class.

Plekhanov was initially dismayed by the February Revolution of 1917, considering it as an event which disorganized Russia's war effort. He soon came to terms with the event, however, conceiving of it as a long-anticipated bourgeois-democratic revolution which would ultimately bolster flagging popular support for the war effort and he returned home to Russia.

Plekhanov was extremely hostile to the Bolshevik Party headed by Lenin and was the top leader of the tiny Yedinstvo group, which published a newspaper by the same name. He criticized Lenin's revolutionary April Theses as "ravings" and called Lenin himself an "alchemist of revolution" for his seeming willingness to leap over the stage of capitalist development in agrarian Russia in advocating socialist revolution. Plekhanov lent support to the idea that Lenin was a "German agent" and urged the Russian Provisional Government of Alexander Kerensky to take severe repressive measures against the Bolshevik organization to halt its political machinations.

Marriage

In 1879, Plekhanov married Rozalia Bograd, who accompanied him into exile in Switzerland in 1880. They had four daughters, two of whom died in childhood. Rozalia was born in 1856 in the Jewish colony of Dobroe in Kherson Oblast (present day Ukraine but at that time part of the Russian Empire). She trained as a doctor in Saint Petersburg (medical courses for women were first opened in 1873) and joined the ranks of the Populists or Narodniks, spending the summer of 1877 in the village of Shirokoe in Samara Oblast where she sought (without very much success) to raise the political consciousness of the local peasantry. She went to the front during the Russo-Turkish War (1877–1878) where she recorded witnessing medical personnel treated badly, the sick cared for inadequately and military authorities engaged in theft and corruption. Her experiences there served to reinforce her radicalism. Rozalia, who had not been permitted to graduate in Russia, retrained in Switzerland and supported her family during its time in Geneva by working as a doctor. They lived variously in Geneva, Paris and for a time on the Italian Riviera on the advice of Plekhanov's doctors. She accompanied her husband back to Petrograd following the February Revolution and was with him when he died of tuberculosis in Finland in 1918. She returned to Paris where she died in 1949.

Death and legacy

Plekhanov left Russia again after the October Revolution due to his hostility to the Bolsheviks. He died of tuberculosis in Terijoki, Finland (now a suburb of St. Petersburg, called Zelenogorsk) on 30 May 1918. He was 61. At his funeral, Nicolas Slonimsky was requested to play the piano, and chose a funeral march by Beethoven. Plekhanov was buried in the Volkovo Cemetery in St. Petersburg near the graves of Vissarion Belinsky and Nikolay Dobrolyubov.

It was evident that Plekhanov and Lenin disagreed in terms of commitment to political action, as well as direct guidance to the working class. Despite his disagreements with Lenin, the Soviet Communists cherished his memory and gave his name to the Soviet Academy of Economics and the G. V. Plekhanov St. Petersburg State Mining Institute.

During his life Plekhanov wrote extensively on historical materialism, on the history of materialist philosophy, on the role of the masses and of the individual in history. Plekhanov always insisted that Marxism was a materialist doctrine rather than an idealist one, and that Russia would have to pass through a capitalist stage of development before becoming socialist. He also wrote on the relationship between the base and superstructure, on the role of ideologies, and on the role of art in human society. He is remembered as an important and pioneering Marxist thinker on such matters.

Works

 Socialism and the Political Struggle (1883) Plekhanov: Socialism and Political Struggle (1883)
 Our differences (1885) G.V. Plekhanov: Our Differences (1885)
 G. I. Uspensky (1888)
 A New Champion of Autocracy (1889)
 S. Karonin (1890)
 The Bourgeois Revolution (1890–1891)
 The Materialist Conception of History (1891)
 For The Sixtieth Anniversary of Hegel's Death (1891)
 Anarchism & Socialism (1895)
 The Development of the Monist View of History (1895)
 Essays on the History of Materialism (1896)
 N. I. Naumov (1897)
 A. L. Volynsky: Russian Critics. Literary Essays (1897)
 N. G. Chernyshevsky's Aesthetic Theory (1897)
 Belinski and Rational Reality (1897)
 On the Question of the Individual's Role in History (1898)
 N. A. Nekrasov (1903) In Russian.
 Scientific Socialism and Religion (1904)
 On Two Fronts: Collection of Political Articles (1905) In Russian.
 French Drama and French Painting of the Eighteenth Century from the Sociological Viewpoint (1905)
 The Proletarian Movement and Bourgeois Art (1905)
 Henrik Ibsen (1906)
 Us and Them (1907) In Russian.
 On the Psychology of the Workers' Movement (1907)
 Fundamental Problems of Marxism (1908)
 The Ideology of Our Present-Day Philistine (1908)
  Tolstoy and Nature (1908)
 On the So-Called Religious Seekings in Russia (1909)
 N. G. Chernyshevsky (1909)
 Karl Marx and Lev Tolstoy (1911)
 A. I. Herzen and Serfdom (1911)
 Dobrolyubov and Ostrovsky (1911)
 Art and Social Life (1912–1913)
 Year of the Motherland: Complete Collected Articles and Speeches, 1917–1918, In Two Volumes. Volume 1; Volume 2 (1921) In Russian.

Footnotes

Further reading

 Samuel H. Baron, Plekhanov: The Father of Russian Marxism. Stanford, CA: Stanford University Press, 1963.
 Plekhanov in Russian History and Soviet Historiography. Pittsburgh: University of Pittsburgh Press, 1995.
 Georgi Plekhanov: Selected Philosophical Works in Five Volumes. Moscow: Progress Publishers, 1974.

External links
Progress Publishers put out a five-volume Selected Philosophical Works of Georgi Plekhanov in English between 1974 and 1981:
 Volume I
 Volume II
 Volume III
 Volume IV
 Volume V

 
 
 Georgi Plekhanov Internet Archive, Marxists Internet Archive, marxists.org/
 Georgi Plekhanov Biography, Spartacus UK, spartacus-educational.com/
 Georgii Plexhanov Collected Works in 24 Volumes , Plekhanov Fond, plekhanovfound.ru/ In Russian.
 Tomb of Plekhanov
 The Plekhanov House in The National Library of Russia 
 Archive of Georgij Valentinovič Plechanov Papers at the International Institute of Social History
 

1856 births
1918 deaths
People from Gryazinsky District
People from Lipetsky Uyezd
Russian people of Tatar descent
Narodniks
Russian Social Democratic Labour Party members
Mensheviks
Marxist theorists
Russian Marxist writers
Russian philosophers
Russian political writers
Russian Marxists
Russian revolutionaries
Spinoza scholars
20th-century deaths from tuberculosis
Tuberculosis deaths in Finland